The 1997 True Value 500 was the sixth round of the 1996–1997 Indy Racing League season. The race was held on June 7, 1997, at the  Texas Motor Speedway in Fort Worth, Texas, and it marked the first American open-wheel superspeedway night race.

Qualifying

The qualifying format was 3-laps, with the average speed deciding grid positions. During their 3rd lap, every driver had to enter the pit lane (with a 120 mph speed limit), stop in a designated spot 30 feet short of the start/finish line and make a pit stop. A maximum of 3 crew members were allowed: one jacking the car up and the other two changing only the front and rear right tires. Finally, the driver had to cross the finish line to complete his qualifying attempt.

  Could not complete his qualifying run after missing his pit box.
  Entered the pits at the end of the second lap by mistake.
  Named for the ride after qualifying, he was allowed to start the race at the back of the field.
  Could not qualify because of an engine shortage in Team Scandia, but was allowed to start the race at the back of the field.
  Crashed in practice and could not qualify, but was allowed to start the race at the back of the field with a backup chassis loaned by Blueprint Racing.

Failed to qualify or withdrew 
 Mike Groff for Byrd-Cunningham Racing - fractured his lower left tibia during practice. Replaced by  Johnny Unser
 Scott Harrington R for Johansson Motorsports - withdrew prior to the start of practice.
 Billy Roe R for EuroInternational - withdrew prior to the start of practice.
 Stéphan Grégoire for Chastain Motorsports - withdrew prior to the start of practice.
 Lyn St. James for Hemelgarn Racing - withdrew prior to the start of practice.

Race recap

At the start, Marco Greco's engine exploded and trailed oil and metal pieces all over the track, leading to a lengthy cleanup. When the green flag finally fell on lap 20, the Menard cars pulled off, with only Buddy Lazier and Greg Ray being able to keep up. However, the four stayed out too long after everyone else had pitted and lost time on old tires; Tony Stewart ran out of fuel on lap 69 and fell a lap down. By lap 70, a four-way battle for the lead was occurring for the lead, and popular Jim Guthrie assumed it on lap 76, only to lose it five laps later after blowing a tire exiting turn 4. Lazier then took over the lead while Arie Luyendyk worked his way towards the front, having rookie Billy Boat within striking distance, and Stewart rapidly reeling them in.

During a caution around lap 140, the scoring problems began. After Lazier and Stewart had had a furious wheel-to-wheel duel, Luyendyk inexplicably dropped out of the top 10 in the electronic scoring system, which was not properly counting his laps and those of several other drivers, including Scott Goodyear. Tyce Carlson and Goodyear got bottled up on a restart on lap 143, made contact, and spun into the quad-oval infield. Lazier retired on lap 157 with engine failure and Stewart and Boat appeared to be on the lead lap by themselves. Stewart set off to lap the field, which he appeared to have done by lap 180.

On lap 190, Stewart, in traffic, handed the lead to Luyendyk by waving him, thinking the Dutch driver was a lap down. Stewart, thus, was scored as the leader in the final laps, and appeared to have nearly a one-lap lead over Billy Boat. However, as he crossed the line with two laps to go, the engine blew. His car spun in turn 1, and crashed into the outside wall. Boat caught up, appeared to take the lead and, due to the scoring error, race officials showed him the checkered flag as the winner of the race. While Boat and his car owner A. J. Foyt were celebrating in victory lane, Luyendyk stormed in, claiming he had won the race and demanding an explanation from the officials. He was intercepted by Foyt, who slapped Luyendyk, told him to leave and shoved him to the ground before security separated the two and led Luyendyk away. The incident was not shown live in the broadcast, as it happened right after the interviews, but was caught on camera by the TV crew. Foyt and Luyendyk were fined $20,000 and $14,000 respectively, for unsportsmanlike behavior.

The race tape was reviewed and it was determined that Luyendyk was right; he had finished on a lap by himself and had actually completed more laps than the scheduled race distance, being declared the official winner the following day. The results was revised back to the proper ending lap, shuffling the entire top 10. Luyendyk, fresh off his Indy 500 victory, became the first driver to win two IRL races in a row, but it took almost a week to determine. Foyt, however refused to return the trophy and retains the original to this day. A duplicate was awarded to Luyendyk. The outcome of this race had far-reaching implications for the IRL far beyond the race itself. From the beginning of the IRL until this time, USAC performed the timing and scoring of IRL races, as well as other functions such as technical inspection. The following week, in the wake of the Texas scoring scandal, the restart problems two weeks earlier at Indianapolis and the ensuing bad publicity, USAC was immediately removed from sanctioning the series, putting that organization completely out of Indy car racing after 42 years. The league switched to in-house sanctioning starting with the next event.

Box Score

Official results

Race Statistics
Lead changes: 14 among 9 drivers

Standings after the race
Drivers' Championship standings

 Note: Only the top five positions are included for the standings.

References

External links
RACER - Marshall Pruett: The IRL's coming of age in Texas, 1997
IndyCar official website

1996–97 in IndyCar
Firestone 600
1997 in sports in Texas
True Value 500, 1997